The year 1946 in architecture involved some significant architectural events and new buildings.

Events
 J. M. Richards publishes his anatomy of England's suburbia, The Castles on the Ground, illustrated by John Piper.
 Thomas Sharp publishes The Anatomy of the Village.

Buildings and structures

Buildings
Hudson's department store in Detroit, Michigan, United States is completed.
BISF houses in the United Kingdom, designed by Frederick Gibberd.

Awards
 RIBA Royal Gold Medal – Patrick Abercrombie.
 Grand Prix de Rome, architecture – Guillaume Gillet.

Births
April 24 – Piers Gough, English architect
May 12 – Daniel Libeskind, Polish architect, artist and set designer
date unknown
Alberto Campo Baeza, Spanish architect
Richard Johnson, Australian architect

Deaths
February 4 – Herbert Baker, British architect based in South Africa (born 1862)
August 30 – Theodate Pope Riddle, American architect (born 1867)
December 16 – Zachary Taylor Davis, Chicago-based U.S. architect (born 1872)

References